"La Schmoove" is a song by American hip hop group Fu-Schnickens. The song, which features A Tribe Called Quest member Phife Dawg, was recorded for the group's debut album F.U. Don't Take It Personal and released as the second single from the album in April 1992. A portion of the song can be heard briefly in the film Falling Down.

Track listing
12", Vinyl
"La Schmoove" (LP Version) - 4:58
"La Schmoove" (Remix) - 4:55
"La Schmoove" (LP Instrumental) - 4:58
"Movie Scene" (LP Version) - 4:01
"Movie Scene" (Stimulated Dummies Remix) - 4:18
"Movie Scene" (LP Instrumental) - 4:01

CD
"La Schmoove" (LP Version) - 4:58
"La Schmoove" (Remix) - 4:55
"La Schmoove" (LP Instrumental) - 4:58

Personnel
Information taken from Discogs.
mastering – Tom Coyne
mixing – Ali Shaheed Muhammad, Bob Power
production – A Tribe Called Quest, Fu-Schnickens
remixing – Geeby Dajani, John Gamble, K-Cut, Dante Ross

Chart performance

Notes 

1992 songs
1992 singles
Fu-Schnickens songs
Jive Records singles
Songs written by Ali Shaheed Muhammad
Songs written by Phife Dawg